The 2021 Texas State Bobcats football team represented Texas State University as a member of the West Division of the Sun Belt Conference during the 2021 NCAA Division I FBS football season. The Bobcats were led by third-year head coach Jake Spavital and played their home games at Bobcat Stadium in San Marcos, Texas.

Previous season
The Bobcats finished the 2020 season with a 2–10 record (2–6 in conference), finishing fourth in the Sun Belt West Division. Texas State was not invited to any postseason competition.

Preseason

Recruiting class

|}
Source:

Award watch lists
Listed in the order that they were released

Preseason

Sources:

Sun Belt coaches poll
The Sun Belt coaches poll was released on July 20, 2021. The Bobcats were picked to finish fourth in the West Division.

Sun Belt Preseason All-Conference teams

Offense

2nd team
Marcell Barbee – Wide Receiver, JR

Defense

2nd team
Nico Ezidore – Defensive Lineman, JR

Personnel

Schedule
The 2021 schedule consists of 6 home and 6 away games in the regular season. The Bobcats will travel to Sun Belt foes Georgia State, Louisiana, Coastal Carolina, and Arkansas State. Texas State will play host to Sun Belt foes South Alabama, Troy, Louisiana–Monroe, and Georgia Southern.

Texas State will host two of the four non-conference opponents at Bobcat Stadium, Baylor of the Big 12 Conference and Incarnate Word from the NCAA Division I FCS Southland Conference, and will travel to FIU of the Conference USA and Eastern Michigan of the Mid-American Conference.

Game summaries

Baylor

at FIU

Incarnate Word

at Eastern Michigan

South Alabama

Troy

at Georgia State

at Louisiana

Louisiana–Monroe

Georgia Southern

at Coastal Carolina

at Arkansas State

References

Texas State
Texas State Bobcats football seasons
Texas State Bobcats football